Dariush Rezaeian (born April 22, 1981) is an Iranian football player who currently plays for Payam Mashhad in Azadegan League. He usually plays in the striker position.

Club career
Rezaeian started at Abadani side Sanat Naft Abadan F.C., where he was spotted to be a sensational player in offense. It was expected that he would move to a bigger, and more successful, club sooner or later. In late August 2006 Persepolis F.C., Iran's most successful club of all time, signed Rezaeian on a 2-year contract.

Club Career Statistics

External links
Rezaeian joins Persepolis

Iranian footballers
Persepolis F.C. players
Living people
1981 births
Association football forwards